Space Launch Complex 17 (SLC-17), previously designated Launch Complex 17 (LC-17), was a launch site at Cape Canaveral Air Force Station (CCAFS), Florida used for Thor and Delta launch vehicles launches between 1958 and 2011.

It was built in 1956 for use with the PGM-17 Thor missile, the first operational ballistic missile in the arsenal of the United States. More recently the launch complex has been used for vehicles in the Delta launch vehicle family, derived from the Thor missile, to launch probes to the Moon and planets, solar observatories and weather satellites.

SLC-17 features two expendable launch vehicle (ELV) launch pads, 17A and 17B. The pads were operated by the 45th Space Wing and have supported more than 300 Department of Defense, NASA and commercial missile and rocket launches. Following the last military launch, in August 2009, SLC-17A was withdrawn from use, and LC-17B was transferred to NASA (SLC-17B) for two remaining launches.

Pad 17A supported its first Thor missile launch on 3 August 1957, and Pad 17B supported its first Thor launch on 25 January 1957. The site was upgraded in the early 1960s to support a variety of more modern ELVs, which were derived from the basic Thor booster. The modern ELVs based on Thor came to be called the Delta family of launch vehicles.

Thirty-five early Delta rocket missions were launched from Complex 17 between the beginning of 1960 and the end of 1965. At that time the complex was operated by the US Air Force. The US Air Force transferred Launch Complex 17A to NASA (SLC-17A) in 1965, but the site was returned to the US Air Force in 1988 to support the Delta II program.

As Delta II launches continued over the next decades, Pad 17B was modified in 1997 to support a new, more powerful launch vehicle, the Delta III, which made its maiden flight from the complex on 26 August 1998. The launch ended in failure, as did a second launch the next year. After a third launch on 23 August 2000 placed a mass simulator into a lower than planned orbit, the program was abandoned.

Among the major NASA missions launched from the complex were the Explorer and Pioneer space probes, all of the Orbiting Solar Observatories, the Solar Maximum Mission, biological satellites (Biosatellite program), the International Cometary Explorer (ICE), the TIROS and GOES meteorology satellites, and the Mars Exploration Rovers Spirit and Opportunity.

On 10 September 2011, a Delta II 7920H-10C made the final launch from SLC-17B, carrying NASA's GRAIL spacecraft. All remaining Delta II launches were made from Vandenberg Air Force Base in California.

At 11:00 UTC (7:00 a.m. EDT) on 12 July 2018, both launch towers had been demolished via controlled demolition to make way for Moon Express to build and test its lunar lander.

Notes

References 

  

Cape Canaveral Space Force Station